Zelleria malacodes is a moth of the family Yponomeutidae. It is found in Australia, including Tasmania.

External links
Australian Faunal Directory
Yponomeutidae of Tasmania

Yponomeutidae